El Socorro is a town in the state of Guárico, Venezuela. It is the shire town of El Socorro Municipality.

Populated places in Guárico